The Cagua tree frog (Boana alemani) is a species of frog in the family Hylidae endemic to Venezuela. Its natural habitats are subtropical or tropical moist lowland forests, rivers, freshwater marshes, and intermittent freshwater marshes. It is threatened by habitat loss.

References

Sources

Cagua tree frog
Amphibians described in 1964
Taxonomy articles created by Polbot